Kabra Khurd is a village in Palamu district of Jharkhand state, India. Khurd and Kalan Persian language word which means small and Big respectively when two villages have same name then it is distinguished as Kalan means Big and Khurd means Small with Village Name.

This village was settled in about 14th century, before that it was full forest due to Son river, in which forest animals lived, during 14th to 15th century a person named (Sheikh) from Sher Shah Shuri's fighters who  Originally Arabs or Afghans, their descendants came here and populated this place.

It is a located near Son river. The population is approximately 6000. Languages spoken here are Urdu, Hindi, English, Arabic and local dialects.  Cricket and Football are most popular sports here.

References

Villages in Palamu district